Ovalau, also known as Avalau, is an island in Tonga, it is located within the Vava'u Group in the far north of the country.

References

Islands of Tonga
Vavaʻu